The Women's 100 Backstroke at the 11th FINA World Aquatics Championships was swum 25 – 26 July 2005 in Montreal, Quebec, Canada. Preliminary and Semifinal heats were 25 July; the Final heat on 26 July.

At the start of the event, the existing World (WR) and Championships (CR) records were:
WR: 59.58, Natalie Coughlin (USA), swum 13 August 2002 in Fort Lauderdale, USA;
CR: 1:00.16, Cihong He (China), swum 10 September 1994 in Rome, Italy

Results

Preliminaries

Semifinals

Final

References

Swimming at the 2005 World Aquatics Championships
2005 in women's swimming